Altzaga is a town located in the Goierri region of the province of Gipuzkoa, in the autonomous community of the Basque Country, in the north of Spain. As of 2014 Altzaga had a total population of 165.

References

External links
 Official Website 
 ALTZAGA in the Bernardo Estornés Lasa - Auñamendi Encyclopedia (Euskomedia Fundazioa) 

Municipalities in Gipuzkoa